Hongqiao is a town in the northeast of Pingjiang County in the Tianjing Mountains of northeastern Hunan province, China, situated near the border with Jiangxi. , it has one residential community and 34 villages under its administration.

See also 
List of township-level divisions of Hunan

References 

Towns of Hunan
Pingjiang County